Woodstock Road may refer to:

Woodstock Road (Oxford), in Oxford, England
Woodstock Road railway station
Woodstock Road Baptist Church, located in Summertown, Oxford, England
Woodstock Road (Maryland), in Woodstock, Maryland
The main road in Cregagh, Belfast